is a railway station in Meitō-ku, Nagoya, Aichi Prefecture, Japan

Lines

 (Station number: H22)
Aichi Rapid Transit
Linimo (Station number: L01)

Layout

Nagoya Municipal Subway

Platforms

Linimo

Platforms

Adjacent stations

References

External links
 

Railway stations in Japan opened in 1969
Railway stations in Japan opened in 2005
Railway stations in Aichi Prefecture